Us is the second studio album by American singer-songwriter and producer Empress Of, released on October 19, 2018 via XL Recordings and Terrible Records. The album was preceded by the double A-side single "Trust Me Baby / In Dreams",  released on April 11, 2018, and three promotional singles: "When I'm with Him", released on August 22; "Love for Me", released on September 24; and "I Don't Even Smoke Weed", released on October 17.

"When I'm with Him" is part of the soundtrack of eFootball PES 2020.

Track listing

References

2018 albums
Terrible Records albums
XL Recordings albums
Empress Of albums
Albums produced by Cole M. Greif-Neill
Albums produced by Dev Hynes